Goodshirt are an alternative/pop/rock band from Auckland, New Zealand. The band formed when keyboardist Gareth Thomas left his computer recording setup with the Fisher brothers, Rodney and Murray, for safe keeping.

While still a three piece, the band submitted their song "Green" to a track competition run by radio station 9inety6dot1. Subsequently, station manager Grant Hislop became their manager, and the band was rounded out with drummer Mike Beehre joining the fold.

"Sophie", the fourth single from their debut album Good, was a number one single in New Zealand. Good was released in Canada, Australia, and Japan.

A second album, Fiji Baby, was released in 2004. Like its predecessor, it reached number 5 in the New Zealand charts.

The band went on hiatus in 2005 when Rodney Fisher moved to London to work with Breaks Co-Op, but reunited in 2011, and in early 2012 they began playing again with support gigs for Hall & Oates and Icehouse as part of the A Day on the Green festival. In May 2012 Goodshirt released the new EP Skinny Mirror and including the singles "So Charming" and "Out of Our League".

In 2014, the band released a cover of "Sierra Leone" originally by Coconut Rough. It was made available as a free download through their SoundCloud band page, along with the release of an official music video on YouTube.

Members 

 Rodney Fisher – guitar and vocals
 Murray Fisher – guitar
 Gareth Thomas – keyboards/bass and vocals
 Mike Beehre – drums

Music videos

Five videos were directed by Joe Lonie, including some that were shot in a single take. Lonie notes that at the height of their close creative relationship, "they even talked about me being an unofficial fifth member of the band."

Discography

Albums

EPs

Singles

Featured appearances

Goodshirt has appeared on many compilations and soundtracks in both New Zealand and Australia.

 2001 – Starf(Star)Ckers Cyber Garage Music from Planet Aotearoa (Antenna Recordings/EMI) – "Everyday"
 2001 – Channel Z The Best of Vol. 2 (Warner Music) – "Blowing Dirt"
 2001 – 100% Kiwi Rock (Warner Music) – "Green"
 2002 – Top of the Pops 2002 Vol. 2 (Universal Music) – "Sophie"
 2002 – Channel Z: The Best of Vol. 3 (Universal Music) – "Green"
 2003 – The Strip Soundtrack (Loop Recordings) – "Sophie"
 2003 – Coleman Sessions Recorded Live at York Street (Warner Music) – "Green"
 2004 – Hot Wheels: Hot Hits 4 (Shock Records) – "Blowing Dirt"
 2004 – State of the Nation (EMI) – "Buck It Up"
 2004 – Big Day Out 04 (Universal Music) – "Sophie"
 2004 – Now That's What I Call Music 16 (EMI) – "Fiji Baby"
 2004 – Triumph (Sony Music) – "Sophie"
 2005 – Top of the Pops 2005 (Universal Music) – "Buck It Up"
 2005 – Lazy Sunday 5 (EMI) – "My Racing Head"
 2005 – Triple J – Like a Version: Vol. 1 (ABC Music) – "Gouge Away" (Pixies cover)
 2006 – More Nature (Sony BMG) – "Sophie"
 2007 – Outrageous Fortune Westside Rules (WM New Zealand) – "Buck It Up"

References

External links
AudioCulture profile

New Zealand indie rock groups
Musical groups established in 2000
Musical groups from Auckland
New Zealand pop rock groups